The Kerala Film Critics Association Award for Best Screenplay is one of the annual awards given at the Kerala Film Critics Association Awards, honouring the best in Malayalam cinema.

Superlatives

Winners

See also
 Kerala Film Critics Association Award for Best Story
 Kerala Film Critics Association Award for Best Director

References

Screenplay
Screenwriting awards for film